The men's 50 metre rifle three positions event at the 2012 Olympic Games took place on 6 August 2012 at the Royal Artillery Barracks.

The event consisted of two rounds: a qualifier and a final. In the qualifier, each shooter fired 120 shots with a .22 Long Rifle at 50 metres distance. 40 shots were fired each from the standing, kneeling, and prone positions. Scores for each shot were in increments of 1, with a maximum score of 10.

The top 8 shooters in the qualifying round moved on to the final round. There the shooters go through the new ISSF final, which consists of 45 shots, if you make it through the entirety of the final. The shooters start off in the kneeling position, where they fire three series of five shots, with decimal scoring. Then the shooters move on, to changeover and sighting time, which first consists of seven minutes. Then the shooters go into the prone position, where again they shoot three series of five shoots, on decimal scoring. The second changeover time, for the standing position, consists of nine minutes. The athletes shoot two series of five shoots, with decimal scorings. When the first two series are done, seventh and eight place are "eliminated, " kicked out of the competition. Then after every shot, the athlete with the lowest score is eliminated, until the best shooter is found.

In 2012, the finals were shot under the old format, with the qualification scores carrying over into the final, and only ten shots in the standing position are fired, in decimal scores.

Records
Prior to this competition, the existing world and Olympic records were as follows.

Qualification round

Final

References

External links
Official results

Shooting at the 2012 Summer Olympics
Men's 050m 3 positions 2012
Men's events at the 2012 Summer Olympics